Final Holocaust is the debut album by the French death metal band Massacra. It was released in 1990 by Shark Records. The re-release includes three demo tracks taken from the Nearer from Death demo.

Track listing
All songs written and arranged by Massacra.
  "Apocalyptic Warrior"   – 5:24  
  "Researchers of Tortures"  – 4:01  
  "Sentenced for Life"  – 5:12  
  "War of Attrition"  – 4:46  
  "Nearer to Death"  – 5:32  
  "Final Holocaust"  – 5:39  
  "Eternal Hate"  – 3:23  
  "The Day of Massacra"  – 5:45  
  "Trained to Kill"  – 4:13  
  "Beyond The Prophecy"  – 3:21  
  "Apocalyptic Warrior"  – 6:05  (Demo 1989)
  "Nearer From Death"  – 7:50  (Demo 1989)
  "Sentenced For Life"  – 5:16  (Demo 1989)

Personnel
Jean-Marc Tristani - Lead Guitar
Fred Duval - Rhythm Guitar, Vocals
Pascal Jorgensen - Vocals, Bass
Chris Palengat - Drums
Gil Formosa - artwork

Massacra albums
1990 debut albums